The 53rd Filmfare Awards  organized by Filmfare, honored the best Bollywood films of 2007. It took place on 16 February 2008 at the Yash Raj Studios, Mumbai.

Chak De! India, Guru and Om Shanti Om led the ceremony with 10 nominations each, followed by Saawariya with 8 nominations and Jab We Met with 7 nominations.

Chak De! India, Guru and Taare Zameen Par won 5 awards, thus becoming the most-awarded films at the ceremony.

Shahrukh Khan received dual nominations for Best Actor for his performances in Chak De! India and Om Shanti Om, winning his 7th award in the category for the former. 

Kareena Kapoor won her first and only Best Actress award for her performance in Jab We Met.

Konkona Sen Sharma received dual nominations for Best Supporting Actress for her performances in Laaga Chunari Mein Daag and Life in a... Metro, winning for the latter.

The event was also notable as Madhuri Dixit received her 13th nomination for Best Actress for her role in Aaja Nachle, breaking the record held by Meena Kumari (with 12 nominations) for 35 years.

Awards and nominees

Main awards

Critics' awards

Technical Awards

Special awards

Maximum nominations and wins 

 
The following films received multiple nominations.
10 nominations: Guru, Chak De! India and Om Shanti Om
9 nominations: Taare Zameen Par
8 nominations: Saawariya
7 nominations: Jab We Met
6 nominations: Life in a... Metro 
2 nominations: Parzania and Aaja Nachle

The following films received multiple awards.
5 awards: Chak De India, Guru and Taare Zameen Par
3 awards: Life in a... Metro and Saawariya
2 awards: Jab We Met and Om Shanti Om

See also

 Filmfare Awards
 52nd Filmfare Awards
 54th Filmfare Awards
 55th Filmfare Awards

External links

Filmfare Awards
2008 Indian film awards